Atrium Health Ballpark is a baseball stadium in Kannapolis, North Carolina. As of March 2021, it is the home of the Kannapolis Cannon Ballers, the Carolina League affiliate of the Chicago White Sox, replacing Intimidators Stadium. The stadium is located adjacent to the North Carolina Research Campus and is the centerpiece of a $100 million redevelopment of downtown Kannapolis.

The ballpark hosts amateur baseball, community events and concerts in addition to the Cannon Ballers. A ten-year naming rights agreement with Atrium Health was announced on February 5, 2020.

With the 2020 minor league baseball season canceled due to the COVID-19 pandemic, the ballpark opened to fans in early May as a public park, following COVID-19 protocols.

References

External links
Official Website
Kannapolis Ballpark | Kannapolis Cannon Ballers Stadium

Minor league baseball venues

Sports venues in Cabarrus County, North Carolina
Baseball venues in North Carolina
2020 establishments in North Carolina
Carolina League ballparks